The UNCW Seahawks men's soccer team is a varsity intercollegiate athletic team of University of North Carolina Wilmington in Wilmington, North Carolina, United States. The team is a member of the Colonial Athletic Association, which is part of the National Collegiate Athletic Association's Division I. UNCW's first men's soccer team was fielded in 1966. The team plays its home games at the UNCW Soccer Stadium in Wilmington. The Seahawks are coached by Aidan Heaney.

NCAA Tournament appearances 

UNCW has appeared in three NCAA Tournaments. Its first appearance came in 2009. Their most recent came in 2018.

Achievements 
CAA Men's Soccer Tournament: 1
Champion : 2009
Runner-Up: 2017
CAA Regular Season: 3
Champion : 2008, 2009, 2014
Runner-Up: 2017

Notes

References

External links
 

 
Soccer clubs in North Carolina
1966 establishments in North Carolina
Association football clubs established in 1966